Solomon Linda's Original Evening Birds was a South African vocal group formed by Solomon Linda in 1933. The band is known internationally for their song "Mbube" released in 1939, as it will be the origin of the hit "The Lion Sleeps Tonight". During their activity, they often took part in singing competitions, in which they were unbeatable, according to historian Veit Erlmann. The group disbanded in 1949 after Linda's wedding. They are the pioneers of the musical genres Mbube and Isicathamiya.

Partial discography 

 1938: Makasani/Mfo Ka Linda
 1938: Ngqo Ngqongo Vula/Ngi Boni Sebeni
 1939: Ntombi Ngangiyeshela (recorded c. 1938)/Hamba Pepa Lami
 1939: Yetulisigqoko
 1939: Mbube/Ngi Hambile (recorded c. 1938)
 1939: Sangena Mama/Sohlangana
 1939: Sengiyofela Pesheya/Ziyekele Mama
 1940: Jerusalema (recorded c. 1940)/Basibizalonkizwe
 1940: Sigonde 'Mnambiti (recorded c. 1939)/Bhamporo
 1942: Ngazula Emagumeni (recorded c. 1941)/Gijima Mfana
 1942: Ndaba Zika Linda/Ngiyomutshel'Ubaba
1944: Savumelana (recorded c. 1940)

References 

Musical groups established in 1933
Musical groups disestablished in 1949